Ege Bamyası  (lit. "Aegean okra") is the third studio album by German krautrock band Can, originally released as an LP in 1972 by United Artists. The album contains the single "Spoon", which charted in the Top 10 in Germany, largely because of its use as the theme of a German TV thriller mini-series called Das Messer (The Knife). The success of the single allowed Can to move to a better studio, in which they recorded Ege Bamyası.

Ege Bamyası was remastered as a hybrid SACD in 2004, which includes a booklet with commentary on the album by former Melody Maker journalist David Stubbs, as well as previously unreleased photos of the band. The album has received much critical acclaim since its release and has been cited as an influence by various artists. Several artists have played cover versions of songs from Ege Bamyası. Remix versions of several tracks by various artists are included on the album Sacrilege.

Production and release

With the commercial success of their hit single "Spoon" (which reached #6 on the German charts and sold 300,000 copies), Can was able to hire a large ex-cinema in Weilerswist near Cologne, which they used as a part-working, part-living space, and which they named "Inner Space". However, things nearly didn't work out as guitarist Michael Karoli recalled that the sessions were "frustrated by keyboardist Irmin Schmidt and vocalist Damo Suzuki's playing chess obsessively day in, day out" and that "completing recording became a frantic process, with some tracks having to be recorded practically in real time and the single 'Spoon' added to make up for a shortfall in material."

Ege Bamyası was recorded by Holger Czukay at Weilerswist and originally released in 1972 by United Artists. In September 2004, the album, along with the majority of Can's discography, was remastered and released as a hybrid SACD. The re-release includes a booklet with commentary on the album by David Stubbs, as well as previously unreleased photos of the band.

The success of the song "Spoon" and sales from this album inspired Can to throw a free concert in an attempt to reach a wider audience. The Can Free Concert was filmed by Martin Schäfer, Robbie Müller and Egon Mann for director Peter Przygodda at the Cologne Sporthalle on 3 February 1972 and is included on the Can DVD.

In a 2006 interview with David Stubbs in Uncut magazine Irmin Schmidt commented: "People imagine Can was all done in the editing, but for 'Soup' there was no editing at all. We'd found out the record was too short; it needed ten more minutes of music by the next morning, so we wrote, played and recorded it the night before. No editing!" Czukay added: "We recorded Ege Bamyasi in a new studio, which had formerly been a cinema. That new environment affected the sound. The drums were not so heavy and rough, the vocals and instruments were separated out. 'Vitamin C' became the title track of Dead Pigeon on Beethoven Street, a movie by Samuel Fuller. That's often how it was. We made music, then found a use for it later. 'Soup' is my favourite track."

Cover artwork 
The album cover shows a photograph of a can of "Ege Bamyası" (Turkish for "Aegean okra"). In the August 2006 Uncut interview with Stubbs, Schmidt explained: "The can on the cover is not a silly concept idea. It was a can Jaki had found in a Turkish shop. There, the word Can means something like Life. There's no concept behind titles like "Vitamin C" and "I'm So Green", but certainly we were very organic in our sound by now."

Reception 

Ege Bamyası has received considerable critical acclaim since its release. British music weekly Melody Maker wrote: "Can are without doubt the most talented and most consistent experimental rock band in Europe, England included." PopMatters characterized the album as "every bit as compact and tetchy as its predecessor was epic and spacey," calling it "a masterful piece of psychedelic rock fused with tightly wound funk."

Accolades 
As of November 2020, Acclaimed Music finds Ege Bamyasi to be the 629th most acclaimed album of all time.

Legacy

Influence 
Various artists have cited Ege Bamyası as an influence. Stephen Malkmus of Pavement has been quoted as saying "I played Can's Ege Bamyası album every night before I went to sleep for about three years." Thurston Moore of Sonic Youth recalls, "I found Ege Bamyası in the 49-cent bin at Woolworth's. I didn't see anything written about Can, I didn't know anything about them except this okra can on the cover, which seemed completely bizarre. I finally picked that record up, and I completely wore it out. It was so alluring. Something about it made Can seem to be playing outside of rock 'n' roll. It was unlike anything else I was hearing at the time."
Geoff Barrow of Portishead picked Ege Bamyası as one of their favourite 13 albums on The Quietus' Bakers Dozen series. The band Spoon takes its name from the eponymous track on this album, and cites the band as a major influence.

Covers & samples 
There have been cover versions of songs from Ege Bamyası by various artists. "I'm So Green" was covered by Beck and was submitted for a planned Can tribute album produced by the Dust Brothers. Kanye West sampled "Sing Swan Song" for his song "Drunk and Hot Girls" on the album Graduation, and derives many of the song's lyrics from Damo Suzuki's vocals. Remix versions of several Ege Bamyası songs are included on the album Sacrilege. The Kleptones have incorporated "Vitamin C" into their mix "Hectic City 7 – May Daze". For the album's 40th anniversary, Stephen Malkmus played it in its entirety on 1 December 2012 at WEEK-END Festival in Cologne, Germany. A recording of this performance was released as a limited-edition live album on Record Store Day 2013.

In popular culture 
"Vitamin C" can be heard in Pedro Almodóvar's movie Broken Embraces as well as in Paul Thomas Anderson's adaptation of the Thomas Pynchon novel Inherent Vice. It also features prominently in the 2016 Netflix series The Get Down as a theme for the character Dizzee Kipling and in an episode of Preacher. In addition to Das Messer, "Spoon" also appears in the soundtrack to Morvern Callar while "I'm So Green" was used in the documentary Spaceship Earth.

Track listing

Personnel
Can
Holger Czukay – bass, engineering, editing
Michael Karoli – guitar
Jaki Liebezeit – drums
Irmin Schmidt – keyboards
Damo Suzuki – vocals

Production

Ingo Trauer – original artwork
Richard J. Rudow – original design
Andreas Torkler – design (2004 re-release)

References

External links
Official website
Review by Julian Cope at Head Heritage
Discogs entry for Ege Bamyasi

1972 albums
Can (band) albums
United Artists Records albums